The 1987 Commonwealth Heads of Government Meeting was the tenth Meeting of the Heads of Government of the Commonwealth of Nations.  It was held in Vancouver, Canada, between 13 October 1987 and 17 October 1987, and was hosted by that country's Prime Minister, Brian Mulroney.

The meeting was marked by a confrontation between most Commonwealth leaders, including conference chair Mulroney, and Britain's Margaret Thatcher over the issue of economic sanctions against South Africa with Thatcher opposing sanctions and most other leaders being for sanctions.

References

1987 conferences
1987 in Canada
1987 in international relations
20th-century diplomatic conferences
Canada and the Commonwealth of Nations
1987
Diplomatic conferences in Canada
History of Vancouver
October 1987 events in Canada
Royal tours of Canada